Keisham Meghachandra Singh (born 1 March 1973) is an Indian politician who is serving as President of Manipur Pradesh Congress Committee and Member of Manipur Legislative Assembly from Wangkhem Assembly constituency. In 2017 Manipur Legislative Assembly election, he got 11,293 votes.

Personal life 
He was born on 1 March 1973 in Yairipok.

References 

Indian National Congress politicians from Manipur
Manipur MLAs 2017–2022
People from Thoubal district
1973 births
Living people